Luis Deines Pérez (born March 29, 1973) is a retired male boxer from Puerto Rico, who won the silver medal in the men's light-welterweight (– 63.5 kg) category at the 1995 Pan American Games in Mar del Plata. In the final he was defeated by Argentina's Walter Crucce. Pérez represented his native country at the 1996 Summer Olympics in Atlanta, Georgia, falling in the first round to Poland's Jacek Bielski.

References
Profile

1973 births
Living people
Boxers at the 1996 Summer Olympics
Olympic boxers of Puerto Rico
Boxers at the 1995 Pan American Games
Puerto Rican male boxers
Pan American Games silver medalists for Puerto Rico
Pan American Games medalists in boxing
Light-welterweight boxers
Medalists at the 1995 Pan American Games